The following is a list of characters from the wuxia novel The Return of the Condor Heroes by Jin Yong. Some of these characters are fictionalised personas of, or are based on, actual historical figures, such as Wang Chongyang, Qiu Chuji, Duan Zhixing, Kublai Khan and Yelü Chucai.

The Condor 
The Divine Condor is a giant eagle-like creature living alone in a valley and a former companion of the swordsman Dugu Qiubai. After roaming the land for years and failing to find someone who can rival him in swordplay, Dugu Qiubai came to a cave near a forest and spent the rest of his life there as a hermit. Several years after his death, the Condor encounters Yang Guo by coincidence while he was fighting with a giant serpent. Yang Guo learns Dugu Qiubai's swordplay techniques from the Condor. As he has lost his right arm, Yang Guo trains relentlessly and overcomes his disability to use Dugu Qiubai's Heavy Iron Sword with only one arm. After accomplishing a high level of proficiency in swordplay, Yang Guo ventures out with the Condor to search for Xiaolongnü and reunite with her.

Main characters 

 Yang Guo
 Xiaolongnü

Guo family and associates 

 Guo Jing
 Huang Rong
 Guo Fu is Guo Jing and Huang Rong's elder daughter. Even though she is beautiful and attractive, she is spoiled and insolent and has been rather unfriendly towards Yang Guo since they were young. At one point, she gets into a heated quarrel with Yang Guo while confronting him about how he lied to the Wu brothers that her parents have agreed to let him marry her, and ends up slicing off his right arm with a sword. She marries Yelü Qi in the end. 
 Guo Xiang is Guo Jing and Huang Rong's younger daughter. When she was a newborn baby, she was abducted by Li Mochou but was saved by Yang Guo, whom she has a crush on when she grows up. She is nicknamed "Little Eastern Heretic" after her maternal grandfather, "Eastern Heretic" Huang Yaoshi. In her middle age, she becomes a Buddhist nun and establishes the Emei School.
 Guo Polu is Guo Xiang's twin brother. The sequel, The Heaven Sword and Dragon Saber, reveals that 14 years after the events of The Return of the Condor Heroes, he died along with Guo Jing and Huang Rong during the Battle of Xiangyang.
 Wu Dunru and Wu Xiuwen are Wu Santong's sons. After their mother died, their father became insane and went missing for years. The boys were then raised by Guo Jing and Huang Rong, who also taught them martial arts. Both of them have a crush on Guo Fu and, at one point, nearly fight each other to the death to win her love. However, Yang Guo resolves their dispute by lying that Guo Fu's parents have agreed to let him marry her. The Wu brothers believe Yang Guo and give up on Guo Fu; they eventually marry Yelü Yan and Wanyan Ping respectively, and are said to be expecting children with their wives near the end of the novel.
 Yelü Qi is a son of Yelü Chucai and a descendant of the imperial clan of the former Liao Empire. He is also Zhou Botong's secret apprentice. Towards the end of the novel, he marries Guo Fu and succeeds Lu Youjiao as the chief of the Beggars' Gang.
 Yelü Yan is Yelü Qi's younger sister who marries Wu Dunru.
 Wanyan Ping is a descendant of the imperial clan of the former Jin Empire. Her parents died when the Jin Empire was conquered by the Mongols and she swears vengeance on Yelü Chucai, whom she blames for her losses. She fails to assassinate him and loses to his children in a fight. She eventually reconciles with the Yelüs and marries Wu Xiuwen.

Mongol Empire 
 Jinlun Guoshi is one of the antagonists in the novel. Originally a Tibetan lama, he becomes the Imperial Adviser of the Mongol Empire and represents the Mongols in challenging the Han Chinese wulin. He is defeated by Yang Guo during the Battle of Xiangyang and dies while saving Guo Xiang from being burnt alive. The "Golden Wheel" is a reference to his weapon, which resembles a gold-coloured chakram. Despite his evil nature, he is shown to be gentle towards Guo Xiang, whom he favours because of her intelligence, and has been considering taking her as his fourth apprentice.
 Huodu is a Mongol prince and Jinlun's third apprentice. A cunning and witty person, he is not very loyal to his master. When Jinlun, Huodu and Da'erba are fighting with Yang Guo at Chongyang Palace, Huodu realises that they are losing so he betrays and abandons his master and flees. Later, he disguises himself as a beggar, He Shiwo, murders Lu Youjiao, and tries to become the chief of the Beggars' Gang. However, Yang Guo exposes his real identity and leads Da'erba to him. Da'erba defeats and kills him for betraying their master.
 Da'erba is a Tibetan monk and Jinlun's second apprentice. In contrast with Huodu, he is honest and loyal towards his master even though he is slow-witted. Having been outsmarted by Yang Guo at one point, he has since believed that Yang Guo is the reincarnation of his senior (Jinlun's first apprentice, who is already deceased). When Jinlun, Huodou and Da'erba are fighting with Yang Guo at Chongyang Palace, Huodu abandons his master and flees while Da'erba tries his best to protect his master life, Yang Guo realises that he is truly a good person so he spares his life. 16 years later, he helps Yang Guo eliminate Huodu. After that, to repay Yang Guo for sparing his life, he promises to return home and never step out of Tibet again.
 Möngke is the Great Khan of the Mongol Empire. He personally leads his army to attack Xiangyang and is slain by Yang Guo in the final battle.
 Kublai is a Mongol prince and Möngke's younger brother. He is the chief commander of the Mongol army attacking Xiangyang. After Möngke's death, he eventually succeeds his brother as the Great Khan of the Mongol Empire.
 Yelü Chucai is the Premier of the Mongol Empire and a descendant of the imperial clan of the former Liao Empire.
 Yelü Jin is Yelü Chucai's elder son.

Mercenaries hired by the Mongols 
 Xiaoxiangzi is a martial artist from Xiangxi. He steals the Nine Yang Manual from Shaolin Monastery with Yinkexi and hide it inside the stomach of a white gorilla. They become suspicious and kill each other eventually.
 Yinkexi is a merchant and martial artist from Persia.
 Nimoxing is a martial artist from India. He has his legs amputated after falling into a trap set by Yang Guo using Li Mochou's poison needles. He is slain by Yang Guo in Xiangyang 16 years later.
 Ma Guangzuo is a martial artist from Xinjiang. Unlike the other mercenaries, he is not always a villain and he has helped Yang Guo and Xiaolongnü before. Yang Guo later persuades him to leave the Mongols.

Passionless Valley 
 Gongsun Zhi is the master of Passionless Valley. Although he appears extraordinary, noble and gentlemanly, he is in fact cold-hearted, ruthless and lecherous. A highly skilled martial artist, he wields a pair of blades in combat. After he first meets Xiaolongnü, he tries to make her marry him until Yang Guo shows up and stops him. His true colours are revealed as the story progresses, particularly after his wife returns to seek vengeance on him. He flees the valley after he is blinded in one eye, but returns later to take revenge on his wife and dies together with her when they both fall off a cliff.
 Qiu Qianchi is Qiu Qianren's younger sister and Gongsun Zhi's wife. An insolent and domineering woman, she gradually fell out of her husband's favour and he decided to get rid of her. After drugging her, he broke her limbs and threw her into a underground pit and left her for dead. While struggling to survive, she mastered a skill which allowed her to overcome her disability by using her inner energy to suck distant objects into her mouth and fire them as projectiles towards enemies with extreme force and accuracy. Several years later, Yang Guo encounters her by chance and brings her back to confront Gongsun Zhi, revealing his dark past and true nature. She ultimately falls to her death off a cliff along with her husband.
 Gongsun Lü'e is Gongsun Zhi and Qiu Qianchi's daughter. Unlike her parents, she is kind-hearted and compassionate. She has a crush on Yang Guo and eventually sacrifices herself to help him.
 Fan Yiweng is Gongsun Zhi's most senior apprentice. He has a long white beard and becomes the "Long Bearded Ghost" later.
 Rou'er was a servant girl whom Gongsun Zhi fell in love with. Qiu Qianchi discovered their illicit relationship and forced her husband to kill Rou'er.

Ancient Tomb School 

 Li Mochou, nicknamed "Red Fairy", is Xiaolongnü's senior. She was more powerful in martial arts than her junior at the start of the novel. Although she is beautiful in appearance, she morphs into a vicious killer after her lover betrayed her. However, she appears as a motherly figure to the baby Guo Xiang, whom she kidnaps from her parents. She is seen trying to take the Jade Maiden Sutra from Xiaolongnü on several occasions at the beginning of the novel, but has never been successful. She commits suicide by throwing herself into the fire in Passionless Valley.
 Lin Chaoying was the school's founder. She was both a rival and lover of Wang Chongyang, and equalled him in martial arts prowess.
 Granny Sun is an old woman who lives with Xiaolongnü in the Ancient Tomb. She saves Yang Guo from the bullies at Quanzhen School and wants to help him fend off the priests. She is accidentally killed by Hao Datong during the scuffle. Before her death, she makes Xiaolongnü promise her to take care of Yang for the rest of his life.
 Hong Lingbo is Li Mochou's apprentice. She is rather sympathetic to Lu Wushuang, who was Li's slave then. She is used as a cushion by her master to escape from the love flowers and dies after being pricked by the poisonous flowers.

Lu family 
 Cheng Ying is Lu Wushuang's cousin. After Lu Wushuang's family were murdered by Li Mochou, Cheng Ying was saved by Huang Yaoshi, who took her in as an apprentice. Later, she meets Yang Guo and has a crush on him, but ultimately becomes his sworn sister.
 Lu Wushuang is Lu Liding's daughter and Cheng Ying's cousin. When she was still a child, her family were murdered by Li Mochou, who abducted and enslaved her for years. She manages to escape later and encounters Yang Guo, whom she develops a crush on. She ultimately becomes Yang Guo's sworn sister.
 Lu Zhanyuan, who is mentioned by name only, was Li Mochou's former lover who had died three years before the events of the novel take place. He had reneged his promise to marry Li Mochou and married He Yuanjun instead. This led to Li Mochou holding a grudge against the Lu family, whom she massacres at the start of the novel.
 He Yuanjun was Lu Zhanyuan's wife who committed suicide to join her husband after he died of illness.
 Lu Liding is Lu Zhanyuan's younger brother. Except for his daughter Lu Wushuang, the entire Lu family were brutally murdered by Li Mochou at the start of the novel.

Quanzhen School 

 Wang Chongyang, nicknamed "Central Divine" and is only mentioned by name in the novel, was the founder of the Quanzhen School. Regarded as the most powerful martial artist in the jianghu in his time, he was the first among the five winners of the martial arts contest on Mount Hua and had won the Nine Yin Manual as his prize.
 Zhou Botong, nicknamed "Old Imp" for his childish behaviour despite his old age, is Wang Chongyang's junior and a formidable martial artist. Towards the end of the novel, he becomes the first among the new five winners of the martial arts contest on Mount Hua and replaces Wang Chongyang in the central position as the "Central Imp".
 The "Seven Immortals of Quanzhen" are Wang Chongyang's seven apprentices who lead the Quanzhen School after their master's death. One of them, Tan Chuduan, was killed by Ouyang Feng in the first novel. The other six are:
 Ma Yu, also known as Danyangzi
 Liu Chuxuan, also known as Changshengzi
 Qiu Chuji, also known as Changchunzi
 Wang Chuyi, also known as Yuyangzi
 Hao Datong, also known as Guangningzi
 Sun Bu'er, also known as Qingjing Sanren
 Zhao Zhijing is the most senior of all Quanzhen members after the "Seven Immortals". He was Yang Guo's master when Yang Guo was in Quanzhen. He dislikes the boy, does not teach him any practical martial arts, and allows his other apprentices to bully him. Later in the novel, he collaborates with the Mongols to seize the leadership position of his school, but his plans are foiled and he is killed by Xiaolongnü's jade bees.
 Zhen Zhibing is a senior member of Quanzhen. He has a crush on Xiaolongnü and is unable to restrain himself so he blindfolds and rapes Xiaolongnü when she is immobilised by Ouyang Feng. Xiaolongnü is unaware that Zhen Zhibing was the one who raped her and she wrongly accused Yang Guo until the truth is revealed. When the truth comes to light, Zhen Zhibing, who has been deeply plagued by guilt for years over this incident, begs Xiaolongnü to kill him but she cannot bring herself to. He later sacrifices himself to save Xiaolongnü from death as atonement for his sins. Named Yin Zhiping (尹志平 Yǐn Zhìpíng) in the original version, but his name was changed in later revisions.
 Lu Qingdu is one of Zhao Zhijing's apprentices. Like his master, he hates Yang Guo and takes pleasure in bullying the boy during his time in Quanzhen. At one point, Yang Guo uses the Toad Skill to knock out Lu Qingdu, flees from Quanzhen and eventually joins the Ancient Tomb School. When the Mongols show up at Quanzhen later, Lu Qingdu joins Zhao Zhijing in pledging allegiance to the Mongol Empire, and kills some Quanzhen members who refuse to serve the Mongols. After Zhao Zhijing meets his end, Lu Qingdu and the Quanzhen traitors are executed for their betrayal.

Dali Kingdom 
 Reverend Yideng, previously known as Duan Zhixing and nicknamed "Southern Emperor", is the former ruler of the Dali Kingdom and one of the five winners of the martial arts contest on Mount Hua. He has since abdicated and become a Buddhist monk. Towards the end of the novel, he retains his position among the new five winners of the martial arts contest on Mount Hua as the "Southern Monk".
 Liu Ying, also known as Yinggu and nicknamed "Divine Mathematician", was originally Duan Zhixing's concubine when he was still the emperor of Dali. She had a secret affair with Zhou Botong and bore him a son, but their son died at the hands of Qiu Qianren. After her son's death, she leads a reclusive life in the Black Swamp with only a pair of Nine Tailed Divine Foxes to keep her company.
 Reverend Yideng's close aides:
 Chu Dongshan, nicknamed "Reclusive Fisherman of Diancang".
 Zhang Shaoshou
 Wu Santong is the father of the Wu brothers. He went insane and disappeared when his wife sacrificed herself to save him after he was poisoned by Li Mochou. He only appears again several years later when his boys have grown up.
 Zhu Ziliu participates in the martial arts contest at Dasheng Pass, and later appears to help the protagonists in defending Xiangyang from the Mongols.
 Wu Sanniang was Wu Santong's wife and the mother of the Wu brothers. Her husband was injured and poisoned by Li Mochou, and she saved his life by sucking out the venom from his wound. However, she died from poisoning and Wu Santong was so traumatised that he went berserk and disappeared for many years, only to return when his sons have grown up.

Peach Blossom Island 
 Huang Yaoshi, nicknamed "Eastern Heretic", is the master of Peach Blossom Island and one of the five winners of the martial arts contest on Mount Hua. Towards the end of the novel, he retains his position among the new five winners of the martial arts contest on Mount Hua.
 Ke Zhen'e is the sole surviving member of the "Seven Freaks of Jiangnan" from the first novel. He lives with the Guos and is respected as an elder in the family. Despite holding a grudge against Yang Guo's father for the deaths of his fellows, he treats the boy like the rest of the Guo children after sensing that Yang is not corrupt. Years later, he relates the story of Yang Kang to Yang Guo at the Temple of the Iron Spear. He admires Yang Guo for his chivalry, and is also grateful to Yang for saving his life from Sha Tongtian and company. He forgives Yang Guo's father and promises to help Yang reconstruct his father's tomb.
 Shagu is the orphaned daughter of Qu Lingfeng from the first novel. Huang Yaoshi took her under his care and trained her as his apprentice. Upon learning that she was present at the scene of his father's death, Yang Guo attempts to force her to tell him the details about the incident. However, her ambiguous and unclear answers cause him to mistakenly believe that Guo Jing and Huang Rong murdered his father.
 Feng Mofeng is a former apprentice of Huang Yaoshi and the sole survivor among Huang's original six apprentices (the others were either killed or died of natural causes). He was maimed and banished from Peach Blossom Island by his master when his seniors, Chen Xuanfeng and Mei Chaofeng, betrayed their master. He becomes a blacksmith after leaving the island and he still respects Huang Yaoshi. He sacrifices himself to buy time for Guo Jing and Yang Guo to escape from the Mongol camp.

Shaolin School 

 Jueyuan is the librarian of Shaolin. Although he had not been formally allowed to train in Shaolin martial arts, he secretly built up immense inner energy after reading the Nine Yang Manual.
 Zhang Junbao is Jueyuan's apprentice who memorises part of the Nine Yang Manual from his master. Towards the end of the novel, he and his master are chasing Xiaoxiangzi and Yinkexi, who have stolen the Nine Yang Manual from the Shaolin library. They encounter Yang Guo, who help them defeat the two mercenaries.
 Tianming is the abbot of Shaolin.
 Wuse is the head of the Arhat Hall.
 Wuxiang is the head of the Bodhidharma Hall.

Guo Xiang's friends 
 The "Ghosts of the Western Mountain Cave" are a group of martial artists who dress up as phantoms and ghosts to scare people. They befriend Guo Xiang and become allies of her and Yang Guo. Some of them are:
 Long Bearded Ghost is formerly Gongsun Zhi's eldest apprentice, Fan Yiweng. He is killed by Jinlun Guoshi.
 Big Headed Ghost is killed by Jinlun Guoshi.
 Hanged Ghost
 Life Taking Ghost
 Impermanence Ghost
 Debt Collecting Ghost
 Fearsome Ghost
 Death Ghost
 Pretty Ghost
 Smiling Ghost
 The five Shi brothers live in Ten Thousand Beasts Mountain Manor. They are known for their abilities to tame all kinds of wild beasts. They befriend Guo Xiang and become Yang Guo's allies. The five are:
 Shi Bowei, nicknamed "Mountain King with a White Forehead".
 Shi Zhongmeng, nicknamed "Guanjianzi".
 Shi Shugang, nicknamed "Golden Armoured Lion King".
 Shi Jiqiang, nicknamed "God of Great Strength".
 Shi Mengjie, nicknamed "Eight Handed Immortal Ape".
 Zhang Yimang
 Abbess Shengyin
 Human Cook
 Hundred Herbs Fairy

Others
 Qiu Qianren was the chief of the Iron Palm Gang who was nicknamed "Iron Palm Skimming on Water" for his prowess in martial arts and qinggong. Notorious for committing heinous crimes in the past, he was saved from death by Yideng and has since repented, become Yideng's apprentice and renamed himself Ci'en. He dies in peace after Zhou Botong and Yinggu forgive him for killing their infant son.
 Lu Youjiao is Huang Rong's successor as the chief of the Beggars' Gang who is slow witted but honest and loyal. He is lured into a trap and slain by Huodu, who takes the Dog Beating Staff from him. Guo Xiang, who regards him as a close friend, is devastated by his death.
 Lu Guanying is the son of Lu Chengfeng, one of Huang Yaoshi's original six apprentices. He becomes the leader of the pirates of Lake Tai after his father's death. He plays host to the Heroes' Feast at Dasheng Pass.
 Cheng Yaojia is Sun Bu'er's apprentice and Lu Guanying's wife.
 Sha Tongtian, Hou Tonghai, Lingzhi Shangren, and Peng Lianhu were previously the followers of Wanyan Honglie in the first novel. They were defeated on Mount Hua and captured by Zhou Botong and imprisoned in Quanzhen School's headquarters, Chongyang Palace. Despite the attempts by the Quanzhen Taoists to reform them, the four tried to escape a few times but failed. Ultimately, after one failed escape attempt, the four were crippled by the Taoists and additionally, as three of these people - Hou, Peng and Lingzhi - had injured and killed a few of the guards during this failed attempt, they were blinded in their eyes, leaving Sha as the only one out of the four who could still see. They manage to escape later when the Mongols attacked the Quanzhen School. After living a peaceful, reclusive life for 16 years, they encounter Ke Zhen'e in Jiaxing, and attempt to kill him for fear that he would alert Guo Jing of their whereabouts. Yang Guo comes to Ke's aid and defeats them in a brief fight. They later relate the story of Yang Kang to Yang Guo.
 Lü Wende is the commander of Xiangyang's military forces. He dies ten years after the events of the novel.
 Lü Wenhuan is Lü Wende's brother who takes over his brother's command of Xiangyang's military forces.

Condor Trilogy
Lists of Jin Yong characters
Fictional Song dynasty people